A unique local address (ULA) is an Internet Protocol version 6 (IPv6) address in the address range . Its purpose in IPv6 is somewhat analogous to IPv4 private network addressing, but with significant differences. Unique local addresses may be used freely, without centralized registration, inside a single site or organization or spanning a limited number of sites or organizations. They are routable only within the scope of such private networks, but not in the global IPv6 Internet.

History
In December 1995, the IPv6 address block  was reserved for site-local addresses, that could be used within a "site" for private IPv6 networks. However, insufficient definition of the term site led to confusion over the governing routing rules.

In September 2004, the Internet Engineering Task Force (IETF) deprecated the definition of this address range, and postulated solutions to its problems. The special behaviour for this type of addresses as required at that time was lifted in 2006 and the block returned to regular global unicast.

In October 2005, the IETF reserved the address block  for use in private IPv6 networks and defined the associated term unique local addresses.

Definition
Unique local addresses use prefix , extended with an 'L' bit which indicates that the address is locally assigned.

The block with L = 0,  is currently not defined. It has been proposed that an allocation authority manage it, but this has not gained acceptance in the IETF.

The block with L = 1, or locally assigned addresses,  is divided into  prefixes, formed by setting the forty bits following the prefix  to a randomly generated bit string. This results in the format  for a prefix in this range. RFC 4193 offers a suggestion for generating the random identifier to obtain a minimum-quality result if the user does not have access to a good source of random numbers.

Example
A routing prefix in the range  may be constructed by generating a random 40-bit hexadecimal string, taken for this example to be 0x123456789a. The string is appended to the prefix , which forms the 48-bit routing prefix . For example Subnet ID 0x1 would be the subnet .

Properties
Prefixes in the range  have some characteristics in common with the IPv4 private address ranges: They are not allocated by an address registry and may be used in networks by anyone without outside involvement. They are not mathematically guaranteed to be globally unique, but the probability of a collision is nevertheless extremely small. Reverse Domain Name System (DNS) entries (in ip6.arpa) for  ULAs cannot be delegated in the global DNS.

As  ULAs are not meant to be routed outside their administrative domain (site or organization), administrators of interconnecting networks normally do not need to worry about the uniqueness of ULA prefixes. However, if networks require routing ULAs between each other in the event of a merger, for example, the risk of address collision is very small if the RFC 4193 selection algorithm was used.

Attempts of registration and allocation
SixXS attempted to maintain a voluntary registration database for  ULA prefixes to reduce the risk of different organisations using identical prefixes. When the SixXS services were discontinued on 6 June 2017, the database became read-only.

On 6 December 2020, the Swiss based company 'ungleich'  announced that it would revive the IPv6 ULA registry based on the original SixXS database, citing user demands for a ULA registry.

For the range , different design decisions have been proposed and submitted to the IETF, trading the risk of non-uniqueness for the requirement that the range be managed by a central allocation authority. However, such attempts at standardizing this range have not resulted in a Request for Comments.

See also
Link-local address

Notes

References

External links
 
  (readonly since SixXS sunset, 6 June 2017)
 
 Internet Draft 

IPv6